István Nagy (born 16 May 1986) is a Hungarian football player who plays for Bölcskei SE.

References
Profile at HLSZ

1986 births
Living people
Sportspeople from Dunaújváros
Hungarian footballers
Association football forwards
Dunaújváros FC players
Paksi FC players
BFC Siófok players
Szolnoki MÁV FC footballers
Békéscsaba 1912 Előre footballers
Dorogi FC footballers
Mosonmagyaróvári TE 1904 footballers
FC Ajka players
Kecskeméti TE players
Nemzeti Bajnokság I players
Nemzeti Bajnokság II players
Nemzeti Bajnokság III players
21st-century Hungarian people